A Fish in the Water (originally published as  in 1993), is the memoir of Peruvian writer Mario Vargas Llosa, who won the Nobel Prize in Literature in 2010. It covers two main periods of his life: the first comprising the years between 1946 and 1958, describes his childhood and the beginning of his writing career in Europe. The second period covers his political involvement in later years culminating with his defeat against Alberto Fujimori in the Peruvian presidential elections.

Contents
The book is divided in twenty chapters in which the writer intersperses his narration with topics about his early life and the events related to his political activity in Peru. Along these memories, Vargas Llosa talks about many important experiences for him, like the event when he knew his father whom he believed dead, his first job in the newspaper La Cronica, and others. He also refers the facts related to his political activity, like his participation in the opposite movement to the Peruvian president Alan Garcia in 1987, and his campaign as candidate to the presidency of Peru in 1990. One of the curiosities this work revealed about the writer, was the event when he played in the junior team of Universitario de Deportes, the Peruvian football club he is a supporter of.

Critics
A controversial section of the book contains harsh criticism of fellow Peruvian intellectuals who at some point had a difference of opinion, mostly political in nature, with Mr. Vargas, for instance the aggression against then dying writer Julio Ramón Ribeyro.

In an interview with Clifford Landers (Albuquerque, 5 November 1994), translator Helen Lane mentions that she originally translated the title as "A Fish in Water, without the article, and it was changed to A Fish in the Water, thereby losing the parallelism with the English idiom, 'a fish out of water'."

Footnotes

External links
 New York Times Review
 Complete Review

1993 non-fiction books
Political autobiographies
Literary autobiographies
Works by Mario Vargas Llosa
Seix Barral books